Piz d'Esan is a mountain of the Livigno Alps, located in Graubünden, Switzerland. It is part of the Swiss National Park.

References

External links
 Piz d'Esan on Hikr

Mountains of Graubünden
Mountains of the Alps
Alpine three-thousanders
Mountains of Switzerland
S-chanf
Zernez